Christopher Thornberg is an economist, public speaker, and the founding partner of Beacon Economics, LLC,  an independent research and consulting firm. He is also director of the UC Riverside School of Business Center for Economic Forecasting and Development and an adjunct professor at the school.

Education and early career
Thornberg is a native of Rochester, New York. He graduated from the State University of New York at Buffalo in 1989 with a B.S. in Business Administration from the School of Management. He then attended the UCLA Anderson School of Management where he received his Ph.D in Business Economics in 1997. He first started his career as an economics professor at Clemson University. Soon though, he moved back to UCLA where he researched under the university’s economic forecasting center.

Media Appearances
Thornberg has appeared on NBC’s The Today Show, ABC’s Nightline, CNN, FOX News Channel, NPR, and is regularly quoted in major national and California dailies including The Wall Street Journal, The New York Times, The Washington Post, Los Angeles Times, and Chicago Tribune.

Work
Thornberg has served on the advisory board of Wall Street hedge fund Paulson & Co. Inc. Between 2008 and 2012, he served as a chief economic advisor to the California State Controller's Office and served as Chair of State Controller John Chiang’s Council of Economic Advisors.

References

1967 births
Living people
21st-century American economists
Economists from New York (state)
Businesspeople from Rochester, New York